Ambühl is a surname. Notable people include:

Andres Ambühl (born 1983), Swiss ice hockey player
Elias Ambühl (born 1992), Swiss freestyle skier
Heinz Ambühl, Swiss sports shooter
Joos Ambühl (born 1959), Swiss cross country skier
Michael Ambühl (born 1951), Swiss state secretary for foreign affairs, professor